This is a list of bridges in Jiangsu, China.

Bridges

Chonghai Bridge under construction
Chongqi Bridge
Danyang–Kunshan Grand Bridge
Dashengguan Bridge
Fourth Nanjing Yangtze River Bridge
Huai'an Bridge
Jiajiang Bridge
Jiangyin Suspension Bridge
Jinghang Canal Bridge
Nanjing Yangtze River Bridge
Precious Belt Bridge
Runyang Bridge
Second Nanjing Yangtze Bridge
Sutong Bridge
Taihu Bridge
Taizhou Yangtze River Bridge
Third Nanjing Yangtze Bridge

See also
List of bridges in China
Yangtze River bridges and tunnels

 
Jiangsu